Mucilaginibacter myungsuensis is a non-motile bacterium from the genus of Mucilaginibacter which has been isolated from a mesotrophic lake near the campus of Hankuk University of Foreign Studies in Yongin in Korea.

References

Sphingobacteriia
Bacteria described in 2011